Tabu by Dana is a women's fragrance created by French perfumer Jean Carles in 1931.

Origins
The House of Dana was a perfumery established in 1932 in Barcelona, Spain by lawyer Javier Serra.  It was later headquartered in Paris. 

In 1940, it relocated to the US during the German occupation of France during World War II. Carles worked for Roure Bertrand, a company associated with fashion houses such as Nina Ricci, Christian Dior, Elsa Schiaparelli and Cristóbal Balenciaga.

Ingredients
Carles used an exceptionally high dose of patchouli (10%), which he combined with clove (carnation), oak moss and benzoin (vanilla effect). Other notes include Bergamot, Neroli, Orange, Coriander, Narcissus, Clover, Rose, Ylang Ylang, Jasmine, Cedar, Sandalwood, Vetiver, Civet, Amber, Musk. Supposedly Dana told Carles to "make a perfume a prostitute would wear". It was one of the first "oriental" scents created in the perfume world and one of the heaviest. It was the inspiration for the later orientals Tuvara (1948) and Youth Dew (1951).

Advertising

The long-running print advertisement of Dan's Tabu reproduced the 1901 painting The Kreutzer Sonata by René-Xavier Prinet, inspired by the novella of the same title by Leo Tolstoy, showing a violinist, overcome with passion, breaking off his performance to embrace his female accompanist. The advertisement's tagline was "Tabu, the forbidden fragrance". People looked at the advertisement and linked the embracing couple with the fragrance.

Gallery

References 

Perfumes